Back 2 Life is the third studio album by American R&B singer LeToya Luckett, released on May 12, 2017, through eOne Music Entertainment. The album was preceded by two singles—"Back 2 Life" and "Used To". The album debuted at number 91 on the Billboard 200, marking her lowest charting album in the United States to date. but was a success on the Independent Albums chart and peaked at number four.

Background and promotion
In January 2014, Luckett announced that the title of her third studio album would be called Until Then on The Wendy Williams Show, with a planned 2016 release. "Don't Make Me Wait" was released as a promotional single on February 11, 2014, to iTunes. More than a year later a remix featuring American-rapper T.I. was released on March 10, 2015. On January 5, 2015, Luckett released the track "I'm Ready" on her YouTube channel. On January 16, 2015, Luckett released "Together" inspired to end illegal gun violence in America in recent partnership with the Caliber Foundation.

On December 7, 2016, Luckett released the lead single "Back 2 Life" to iTunes. On March 23, 2017, eOne Music released the teaser trailer to the second single "Used To", continuing from the "Back 2 Life" music video. On April 10, 2017, Luckett announced the release date and new title of her upcoming third studio album on her Twitter account: "HEY LOVES!!! Excited to announce my album #Back2Life hits the stores May 12th!!!", thus renaming it from Until Then to Back 2 Life, with the song "Don't Make Me Wait" removed, and 13 songs added. On April 17, 2017, the album was available for pre-order on iTunes.

Singles
"Back 2 Life" was released as the album's lead single on December 7, 2016. The song debuted at number 26 on the US Adult R&B Airplay chart on February 4, 2017 and has since peaked at number six. The music video was released to Luckett's Vevo account on January 10, 2017.

"Used To" was released as the album's second single on April 17, 2017, with the music video premiering the same day.

"In The Name" was released as the album's third single on the day of release, and the music video for it was released on July 31, 2017.

Commercial performance
In the United States, Back 2 Life debuted at number ninety-one on the Billboard 200, number forty-four on the Top R&B/Hip Hop Albums chart, number thirty on the Top Album Sales chart, number fourteen on the R&B Albums chart, and number four on the Independent Albums chart.

Track listing

Notes
 "Back 2 Life" samples "Back to Life" by Soul II Soul.

Charts

Release history

References

External links 
 

2017 albums
Albums produced by J. White Did It
LeToya Luckett albums